Trevor Churchill (20 November 1923 – April 2020) was an English footballer who played as a goalkeeper for Reading, Rochdale, and Swindon Town. He was also on the reserve teams of Sheffield United and Leicester City. Churchill died in Solihull in April 2020, at the age of 96.

References

1923 births
2020 deaths
Reading F.C. players
Rochdale A.F.C. players
Swindon Town F.C. players
Sheffield United F.C. players
Leicester City F.C. players
Corinthian-Casuals F.C. players
Tonbridge Angels F.C. players
Footballers from Barnsley
English footballers
Association football goalkeepers